Erysipelothrix is a genus of bacteria containing four described species, Erysipelothrix rhusiopathiae, Erysipelothrix tonsillarum, Erysipelothrix inopinata and Erysipelothrix larvae. Additional species have been proposed based on DNA-DNA hybridization studies "The hallmark of Erysipelothrix is the presence of a type B cell wall, in which the peptide bridge is formed between amino acids at positions 2 and 4 of adjacent peptide side-chains and not, as in the vast majority of bacteria, between amino acids at positions 3 and 4."

The best known species within the genus is Erysipelothrix rhusiopathiae, which is the cause of erysipelas of domestic pigs, poultry and other animal species. In humans, E. rhusiopathiae infections are termed erysipeloid. Erysipelothrix tonsillarum has been described as a pathogen for dogs and has been isolated from the tonsils of healthy pigs and cattle. Disease caused by E. inopinata or E. larvae have not been described.

Bacteria of genus Erysipelothrix are straight, or slightly curved, slender, nonmotile rods which may exist singly, in V-shaped pairs, or in short chains. Some strains have a tendency to form long filaments. The bacteria are Gram-positive but can be mistaken for Gram-negative bacteria during analysis because they lose their staining easily. They are aerobic to facultatively anaerobic but not acid-fast.

Phylogeny
The currently accepted taxonomy is based on the List of Prokaryotic names with Standing in Nomenclature (LPSN) and National Center for Biotechnology Information (NCBI)

See also
 List of bacterial orders
 List of bacteria genera

References

External links
Erysipelothrix at BacDive -  the Bacterial Diversity Metadatabase
Erysipelothrix at MicrobeWiki

Mollicutes
Bacteria genera